Sawridge 150 may refer to one of two nearby Indian reserves in Alberta, Canada, both owned by the Sawridge First Nation:

 Sawridge 150G, east of the town of Slave Lake
 Sawridge 150H, west of the town of Slave Lake